Alan Wilson (born 25 September 1967) is an Australian former rugby league footballer. The son of Australian Kangaroos player, Graham Wilson.

Playing career
Wilson was named Dally M rookie of the year in 1987. He played seven seasons for the Cronulla Sharks and is the 5th highest pointscorer for the club. After not being re-signed by the Sharks at the end of 1991, he moved to his brother Craig's club the North Sydney Bears. Alan won a Reserve Grade premiership with the Bears in 1992 before returned to Cronulla.

Wilson could and did play every position. He also went on to represent NSW in State of Origin.

Post playing
Wilson recently returned to Australia after two years as Technical Advisor with Super League club St. Helens. Before that he spent a year in the NRL marketing department and was the brains behind the highly successful "That's my Team" campaign.

Wilson spent seven years as assistant coach at the Parramatta Eels under Brian Smith from 1998 to 2004 after retiring in 1996 after an 11-year career.

Wilson Coached the first Rabbitohs NYC under 20's side in 2008.

References

External links
Alan Wilson at yesterdayshero.com.au

1967 births
Australian rugby league players
New South Wales Rugby League State of Origin players
Bradford Bulls players
Huddersfield Giants players
St. George Dragons players
North Sydney Bears players
Cronulla-Sutherland Sharks players
Living people
Rugby league second-rows
Rugby league locks